The Victoria Women cricket team, previously known as Victorian Spirit, is the women's representative cricket team for the Australian State of Victoria. They play their home games at Junction Oval, St Kilda, Melbourne. They compete in the Women's National Cricket League (WNCL), the premier 50-over women's cricket tournament in Australia. They previously played in the now-defunct Australian Women's Twenty20 Cup and Australian Women's Cricket Championships, a competition which they dominated, having won 36 titles.

History

1891–1930: Early history
Victoria's first recorded match was against New South Wales on 17 March 1891, however, the result is unknown. Their first match with a known result was against New South Wales Second XI, with Victoria winning a one-day, two innings match by 6 wickets on 19 April 1930.

1931–1996: Australian Women's Cricket Championships
Victoria played alongside New South Wales and Queensland in the inaugural season of the Australian Women's Cricket Championships in 1930–31. They continued to play in the Championships until its final season in 1995–96. They won the title 36 times, making them the most successful team.

1996–present: Women's National Cricket League and Twenty20 Cup
Victoria joined the newly-established WNCL in 1996–97. They have won the title twice, in 2002–03 and 2004–05. They are the most successful side in the Australian Women's Twenty20 Cup, having won the title three times, with consecutive wins coming in 2009–10, 2010–11 and 2011–12

Grounds
Victoria have used a number of grounds over the years. Their first recorded home match against Tasmania in 1906 was played at Victoria Park, Melbourne. Historically they have played the vast majority of their home matches at various grounds in Melbourne. Their first match at the Melbourne Cricket Ground was against England in 1934. Since 2002 they have also played occasional matches in Geelong.

Since 2013, Victoria have played most of their home games at Junction Oval, located in the suburb of St Kilda in Melbourne, as well as occasionally at the Melbourne Cricket Ground and Casey Fields. Their two 2019–20 WNCL home games were played at Junction Oval. Their four 2020–21 WNCL league matches, as well as the final, were also played at Junction Oval. In 2021–22, they played six matches at Junction Oval, as well as playing their first ever match at Shepley Oval in Melbourne. In 2022–23, the side returned to just using Junction Oval.

Players

Current squad
Based on squad announced for the 2022/23 season. Players in bold have international caps.

Notable players
Players who have played for Victoria and played internationally are listed below, in order of first international appearance (given in brackets):

 Nell McLarty (1934)
 Kath Smith (1934)
 Hilda Hills (1934)
 Lorna Kettels (1934)
 Anne Palmer (1934)
 Peggy Antonio (1934)
 Winnie George (1937)
 Elsie Deane (1937)
 Joan Schmidt (1948)
 Una Paisley (1948)
 Betty Wilson (1948)
 Lorna Beal (1948)
 Myrtle Edwards (1948)
 Myrtle Baylis (1948)
 Alma Vogt (1949)
 Joan Wilkinson (1949)
 Valma Batty (1951)
 Eileen Massey (1957)
 Joyce Bath (1957)
 Nell Massey (1958)
 Norma Wilson (1961)
 Liz Amos (1961)
 Miriam Knee (1961)
 Lynn Denholm (1963)
 Janice Parker (1963)
 Lorraine Kutcher (1963)
 Betty Maker (1966)
 Elaine Bray (1968)
 Joyce Goldsmith (1968)
 Anne Gordon (1968)
 Shirley Banfield (1972)
 Dawn Rae (1972)
 Margaret Jennings (1972)
 Lesley Johnston (1972)
 Raelee Thompson (1972)
 Sharon Tredrea (1973)
 Cathy Garlick (1973)
 Lorraine Hill (1973)
 Valerie Farrell (1973)
 Janette Tredrea (1976)
 Christine White (1977)
 Sharyn Hill (1978)
 Jen Jacobs (1979)
 Lee Albon (1982)
 Christina Matthews (1984)
 Wendy Napier (1985)
 Karen Brown (1985)
 Sharlene Heywood (1986)
 Ruth Buckstein (1986)
 Zoe Goss (1987)
 Kerry Saunders (1988)
 Melissa Papworth (1990)
 Belinda Clark (1991)
 Cathryn Fitzpatrick (1991)
 Charmaine Mason (1992)
 Julie Calvert (1993)
 Kim Bradley (1994)
 Stephanie Theodore (1995)
 Mel Jones (1997)
 Jane Franklin (1998)
 Megan White (1999)
 Clea Smith (2000)
 Louise Broadfoot (2000)
 Sarah Elliott (2005)
 Ellyse Perry (2007)
 Jess Duffin (2009)
 Elyse Villani (2009)
 Rachael Haynes (2009)
 Julie Hunter (2010)
 Danni Wyatt (2010)
 Kim Garth (2010)
 Meg Lanning (2010)
 Annie Maloney (2011)
 Nicole Bolton (2014)
 Hayley Jensen (2014)
 Kristen Beams (2014)
 Una Raymond-Hoey (2016)
 Molly Strano (2017)
 Sophie Molineux (2018)
 Georgia Wareham (2018)
 Tayla Vlaeminck (2018)
 Annabel Sutherland (2020)
 Alana King (2022)

Coaching staff
 Head coach: Jarrad Loughman
 Assistant coach: Dulip Samaraweera
 Head of Female Cricket: Sharelle McMahon

Honours
Australian Women's Cricket Championships:
Winners (36): 1933–34, 1934–35, 1935–36, 1938–39, 1939–40, 1946–47, 1947–48, 1948–49, 1949–50, 1952–53, 1953–54, 1954–55, 1955–56, 1956–57, 1959–60, 1960–61, 1963–64, 1964–65, 1965–66, 1966–67, 1967–68, 1969–70, 1970–71, 1972–73, 1973–74, 1975–76, 1976–77, 1977–78, 1978–79, 1980–81, 1981–82, 1982–83, 1985–86, 1987–88, 1990–91, 1995–96
Women's National Cricket League:
Winners (2): 2002–03, 2004–05
Australian Women's Twenty20 Cup:
Winners (3): 2009–10, 2010–11, 2011–12

See also
Cricket Victoria
Victoria men's cricket team
Melbourne Stars (WBBL)
Melbourne Renegades (WBBL)

Notes

References

Victoria women's cricket team
Australian women's cricket teams
Cricket in Victoria (Australia)
Cricket clubs in Victoria (Australia)
Spri
Cricket in Melbourne
Cricket clubs in Melbourne